The Queens Zoo is an  zoo located in Flushing Meadows–Corona Park in Queens, New York City. The zoo is part of an integrated system of four zoos and one aquarium managed by the Wildlife Conservation Society in partnership with the New York City Department of Parks and Recreation, and is accredited by the Association of Zoos and Aquariums (AZA).

History 

The facility first opened in 1968, on the former site of the 1964 New York World's Fair.  Initially known as the Flushing Meadow Zoo, it was the first zoo to be designed as 'cageless' from the start.  Robert Moses turned the first shovel full of earth for the new construction on August 20, 1966, and cut the ceremonial ribbon to the new  "Flushing Meadows Zoo" a bit more than two years later on October 26, 1968.

The zoo's aviary is a geodesic dome designed by Thomas C. Howard of Synergetics, Inc. and used during the 1964 Fair. The dome was originally designed as the fair's major indoor assembly hall, with no indoor supports blocking anyone's view, and repurposed for the 1965 season as a tribute to Winston Churchill after he died in 1965. The  diameter dome was one of the largest single-layer structures of its time. It was dismantled and stored after the fair, and was later reassembled in its current location with a mesh netting covering instead of the solid tent of the original dome.

In 1988 the New York City Department of Parks and Recreation entered a partnership with the Wildlife Conservation Society to operate the zoo.  It was temporarily closed for four years to undergo a $16 million renovation, redesign, and reconceptualization.  The facility reopened to visitors on June 25, 1992 as the Queens Zoo.

Animals

The zoo is home to more than 75 species that are native to the Americas. It is the only one of the five zoos in New York City that exhibits Andean bears. The zoo is also home to:  Pumas, California sea lions, coyotes, burrowing owls, Canadian lynxes, Southern pudús, thick-billed parrots, American alligators, Roosevelt elk, American bison, trumpeter swans, king vultures, pronghorns, sandhill cranes, bald eagles, great horned owls, Chacoan peccaries, a walk-through aviary, and a farm with a variety of domestic animals.

References

External links

 New York City Department of Parks and Recreation: Queens Zoo

Zoos in New York City
Flushing Meadows–Corona Park
Zoo
Flushing, Queens
1964 New York World's Fair
Robert Moses projects
Tourist attractions in Queens, New York
Wildlife Conservation Society
Zoos established in 1968
1968 establishments in New York City